The 1969 Atlanta Braves season was the fourth in Atlanta and the 99th overall season of the franchise. The National League had been split into two divisions before the season, with the Braves somewhat incongruously being assigned to the National League West. The Braves finished with a record of 93–69, winning the first ever NL West division title by three games over the San Francisco Giants.

After the season, the Braves played in the first-ever inter-divisional National League Championship Series. They went on to lose the NLCS to the eventual World Champion New York Mets, three games to none.

Offseason

The new National League 

The 1969 season marked the first year of divisional play in Major League Baseball. The Braves (along with the Cincinnati Reds) were placed in the National League West division, despite being located further east than the two westernmost teams in the new National League East, the Chicago Cubs and St. Louis Cardinals. This was because the New York Mets wanted to be in the same division as the reigning power in the NL, which were the Cardinals at the time (to compensate for playing against the Dodgers and Giants fewer times each season). The Cubs consequently demanded to be in the NL East as well in order to continue playing in the same division as the Cardinals, one of the Cubs' biggest rivals. But the primary reason for this odd alignment was that the Cardinals, Giants, and Cubs finished 1-2-3 the previous two seasons and it was feared putting them all in the West would create too big of a disparity in strength between the West and East.

Notable transactions 
 October 14, 1968: 1968 Major League Baseball expansion draft
Al Santorini was drafted from the Braves by the San Diego Padres with the 7th pick.
Skip Guinn was drafted from the Braves by the Montreal Expos with the 17th pick.
Carl Morton was drafted from the Braves by the Expos with the 45th pick.
Cito Gaston was drafted from the Braves by the Padres with the 59th pick.
 December 2, 1968: Darrell Evans was drafted by the Braves from the Oakland Athletics in the 1968 rule 5 draft.
 March 17, 1969: Joe Torre was traded by the Braves to the St. Louis Cardinals for Orlando Cepeda.

Regular season 
Second baseman Félix Millán started the All-Star Game, along with right fielder Hank Aaron, and won his first Gold Glove.

Season standings

Record vs. opponents

Opening Day starters 
 Hank Aaron
 Felipe Alou
 Clete Boyer
 Orlando Cepeda
 Tito Francona
 Sonny Jackson
 Pat Jarvis
 Félix Millán
 Bob Tillman

Notable transactions 
 June 5, 1969: Larvell Blanks was drafted by the Braves in the 3rd round of the 1969 Major League Baseball Draft.
 June 13, 1969: Van Kelly, Walt Hriniak and Andy Finlay (minors) were traded by the Braves to the San Diego Padres for Tony González.
 August 19, 1969: Claude Raymond was purchased from the Braves by the Montreal Expos.
 September 8, 1969: Mickey Rivers and Clint Compton were traded by the Braves to the California Angels for Hoyt Wilhelm and Bob Priddy.
 September 11, 1969: Chico Ruiz was signed as an amateur free agent by the Braves.

Roster

Player stats

Batting

Starters by position 
Note: Pos = Position; G = Games played; AB = At bats; H = Hits; Avg. = Batting average; HR = Home runs; RBI = Runs batted in

Other batters 
Note: G = Games played; AB = At bats; H = Hits; Avg. = Batting average; HR = Home runs; RBI = Runs batted in

Pitching

Starting pitchers 
Note: G = Games pitched; IP = Innings pitched; W = Wins; L = Losses; ERA = Earned run average; SO = Strikeouts

Other pitchers 
Note: G = Games pitched; IP = Innings pitched; W = Wins; L = Losses; ERA = Earned run average; SO = Strikeouts

Relief pitchers 
Note: G = Games pitched; W = Wins; L = Losses; SV = Saves; ERA = Earned run average; SO = Strikeouts

Postseason

National League Championship Series

Awards and honors 
 Rawlings Gold Glove Award
Félix Millán, second base
Clete Boyer, third base

All-Stars 
1969 Major League Baseball All-Star Game
 Hank Aaron, OF, starter
 Félix Millán, 2B, starter
 Phil Niekro, reserve

Farm system 

LEAGUE CHAMPIONS: Greenwood

Notes

References 

 1969 Atlanta Braves team page at Baseball Reference
 Atlanta Braves on Baseball Almanac

Atlanta Braves seasons
Atlanta Braves season
National League West champion seasons
Atlanta